Paula Carballido (born 30 June 1979) is a Spanish former freestyle and medley swimmer who competed in the 2000 Summer Olympics.

References

1979 births
Living people
Spanish female freestyle swimmers
Spanish female medley swimmers
Olympic swimmers of Spain
Swimmers at the 2000 Summer Olympics
Mediterranean Games gold medalists for Spain
Mediterranean Games medalists in swimming
Swimmers at the 2001 Mediterranean Games